Chromis cyanea (blue chromis) is a damselfish in the subfamily Pomacentrinae, found in Bermuda, southern Florida and the Caribbean Sea.

It is collected for the aquarium trade.

Habitat and ecology
Being a shallow water fish, the blue chromis is commonly found at depths of 3 to 5 m, but it can reach depths of 25 m below sea level. 

It's also been recorded at a depth of 60 m below sea level. 

It lives on the surface of reefs, but often swims in the water columns above the reefs to feed on plankton.

Behaviour
It's a rather solitary species, seen alone or in small groups, and tends to stay close to the reefs. 

The younger fish stay near the bottom in order to avoid predators. 

The males maintain a solitary breeding territory. After breeding with multiple females, they guard the eggs until the planktonic larvae hatch.

Use and trade
The blue chromis is largely collected for use in aquariums. 

There are no reliable numbers on the extent of this collecting, but damselfish make up the most intensely collected fish group, making up almost half of the aquarium trade.

Threats
Besides the intense aquarium trade, the rapid expansion of lionfish in the Caribbean and the Atlantic coast, is the greatest threat to the blue chromis, as well as several other tropical fish native to the Caribbean. 

Furthermore, the loss of live corals could have a definite impact on the species, though this has yet to be investigated more closely.

Status
The blue chromis is assessed as "Least Concern" by the IUCN. 

Despite appearing only within an area of 2,500,000 km2, it is considered abundant within that area, without any known continuous decline in range or population numbers. 

It's collected for the aquarium trade, but not in great numbers. Despite this, a deeper study is required, to measure the impact of the decline in habitat quality in the Caribbean has on the species.

References

External links
 
 Video of Blue Chromis - Video taken in Belize off Ambergris Caye.

cyanea
Fish described in 1860
Fish of the Atlantic Ocean